Vittorio Orlandi (born 8 September 1938, in Rome) was an Italian show jumping rider.

Biography
He won bronze medal in team jumping at the 1972 Summer Olympics with Raimondo D'Inzeo, Piero D'Inzeo and Graziano Mancinelli.

See also
 Italy national equestrianism team

References

External links
 

1938 births
Italian show jumping riders
Olympic bronze medalists for Italy
Equestrians at the 1972 Summer Olympics
Olympic medalists in equestrian
Olympic equestrians of Italy
Italian male equestrians
Living people
Medalists at the 1972 Summer Olympics